Dracaenura cincticorpus is a moth in the family Crambidae. It was described by George Hampson in 1897. It is found on the Loyalty Islands in the South Pacific Ocean.

References

Moths described in 1897
Spilomelinae